is a railway station on the Karatsu Line operated by JR Kyushu located in Karatsu, Saga Prefecture, Japan.

Lines

Station layout 
The station consists of a side platform serving a single track. A small concrete waiting room/shelter has been set up behind the platform and there is a designated parking area for bicycles nearby. The station is unstaffed and there is no ticket window but kan'i itaku agents sell some types of tickets from nearby shops.

Adjacent stations

History 
On 23 February 1902, the company, now renamed the Karatsu Railway, merged with the Kyushu Railway. On 1 November 1903, the station was renamed Iwaya. When the Kyushu Railway was nationalized on 1 July 1907, Japanese Government Railways (JGR) took over control of the station. On 12 October 1909, the line which served the station was designated the Karatsu Line. With the privatization of Japanese National Railways (JNR), the successor of JGR, on 1 April 1987, control of the station passed to JR Kyushu.

Passenger statistics
In fiscal 2016, the daily average number of passengers using the station (boarding passengers only) was above 100 and below 323. The station did not rank among the top 300 busiest stations of JR Kyushu.

Environs
National Route 203
Karatsu City Motoyama Elementary School

References

External links 

Iwaya Station (JR Kyushu)

Railway stations in Saga Prefecture
Stations of Kyushu Railway Company
Karatsu Line
Railway stations in Japan opened in 1899